Narkevychi is an urban-type settlement in Khmelnytskyi Raion (district) of the Khmelnytskyi Oblast in western Ukraine. It hosts the administration of Narkevychi settlement hromada, one of the hromadas of Ukraine. The settlement's population was 1,708 as of the 2001 Ukrainian Census and 

The settlement was founded in 1950 as the settlement of Yasne. It received the status of an urban-type settlement in 1968. In 1994, the town of Yasne was renamed to Narkevychi.

Until 18 July 2020, Narkevychi belonged to Volochysk Raion. The raion was abolished in July 2020 as part of the administrative reform of Ukraine, which reduced the number of raions of Khmelnytskyi Oblast to three. The area of Volochysk Raion was merged into Khmelnytskyi Raion.

References

Urban-type settlements in Khmelnytskyi Raion
Populated places established in 1950